Wysokie may refer to the following places in Poland:
Wysokie, Lower Silesian Voivodeship (south-west Poland)
Wysokie, Biała Podlaska County in Lublin Voivodeship (east Poland)
Wysokie, Hrubieszów County in Lublin Voivodeship (east Poland)
Wysokie, Gmina Jastków in Lublin Voivodeship (east Poland)
Wysokie, Sokółka County in Podlaskie Voivodeship (north-east Poland)
Wysokie, Gmina Raczki in Podlaskie Voivodeship (north-east Poland)
Wysokie, Gmina Wiżajny in Podlaskie Voivodeship (north-east Poland)
Wysokie Duże, Gmina Stawiski in Podlaskie Voivodeship (north-east Poland)
Wysokie, Gmina Wysokie in Lublin Voivodeship (east Poland)
Wysokie, Lesser Poland Voivodeship (south Poland)
Wysokie, Zamość County in Lublin Voivodeship (east Poland)
Wysokie, Greater Poland Voivodeship (west-central Poland)
Wysokie, Lubusz Voivodeship (west Poland)
Wysokie, Pomeranian Voivodeship (north Poland)
Wysokie, Warmian-Masurian Voivodeship (north Poland)
Wysokie, West Pomeranian Voivodeship (north-west Poland)